Mad Monk may refer to:

 Ji Gong, a Buddhist monk who lived during the Song Dynasty
 The Mad Monk (1993), a fantasy film about Ji Gong's life starring Stephen Chow
 Nickname of Tony Abbott, an Australian politician